The 36th Curtis Cup Match was played from June 11 to 13, 2010 at Essex County Club in Manchester-by-the-Sea, Massachusetts. The United States won 12 to 7. The Great Britain and Ireland team led 3 to 2 after the first day but the Americans won all 6 matches on the second day and, with the singles matches being shared, won comfortably. The Great Britain and Ireland team included 15-year-old twins, Lisa and Leona Maguire.

Format
The contest was a three-day competition, with three foursomes and three fourball matches on each of the first two days, and eight singles matches on the final day, a total of 20 points.

Each of the 20 matches is worth one point in the larger team competition. If a match is all square after the 18th hole extra holes are not played. Rather, each side earns  a point toward their team total. The team that accumulates at least 10 points wins the competition. In the event of a tie, the current holder retains the Cup.

Teams
Eight players for the USA and Great Britain & Ireland participated in the event plus one non-playing captain for each team.

The American team was selected by the USGA’s International Team Selection Committee.

The Great Britain & Ireland team was selected by the LGU in April 2010.

Friday's matches

Morning foursomes

Afternoon fourballs

Saturday's matches

Morning fourballs

Afternoon foursomes

Sunday's singles matches

References

External links
USGA archive
2010 Curtis Cup (about.sports)

Curtis Cup
Curtis Cup
Curtis Cup
Curtis Cup
Golf in Massachusetts
Events in Essex County, Massachusetts
Curtis Cup
Manchester-by-the-Sea, Massachusetts
Sports competitions in Massachusetts
Sports in Essex County, Massachusetts
Tourist attractions in Essex County, Massachusetts